The N-myc internal ribosome entry site (IRES) is an RNA element found in the n-myc gene. The myc family of genes when expressed are known to be involved in the control of cell growth, differentiation and apoptosis. n-myc mRNA has an alternative method of translation via an internal ribosome entry site where ribosomes are recruited to the IRES located in the 5' UTR thus bypassing the typical eukaryotic cap-dependent translation pathway.

See also 
Mnt IRES
Tobamovirus IRES
TrkB IRES

References

External links 
 

Cis-regulatory RNA elements